Sunnyfields is a historic home at Linthicum Heights, Anne Arundel County, Maryland, United States.  It is partially brick, two and a half stories tall and three bays wide, and was built in 1810. The east portion is of frame construction, six bays long, and two stories high and dates from about 1785. It has characteristics from several periods of Maryland architecture: pre-Federal vernacular (original frame wing), high style Federal (brick wing), and early-20th century mass-produced Classical Revival (columns and stair added in pre-Federal portion).

Sunnyfields was listed on the National Register of Historic Places in 1983.

References

External links
, including photo from 1996, at Maryland Historical Trust

Houses on the National Register of Historic Places in Maryland
Houses in Anne Arundel County, Maryland
Federal architecture in Maryland
Neoclassical architecture in Maryland
Houses completed in 1785
Linthicum, Maryland
National Register of Historic Places in Anne Arundel County, Maryland